Harmony Church is a historic Methodist Episcopal church located at Millsboro, Sussex County, Delaware. It was built in 1891, and is a one-story, wood-frame building covered with asbestos siding and in the Late Gothic Revival style.  It has a two-story wing and sits on a rock-faced, concrete block foundation.  It features a two-story crenellated tower.  The congregation was organized in 1818. The Indian Mission Church was formed from Harmony Church after the hiring of an African American minister.

It was added to the National Register of Historic Places in 1979.

See also
Historical Marker Database: Harmony United Methodist Church
Delaware Public Archives: Harmony United Methodist Church marker

References

United Methodist churches in Delaware
Churches on the National Register of Historic Places in Delaware
Carpenter Gothic church buildings in Delaware
Churches completed in 1891
Churches in Sussex County, Delaware
Nanticoke tribe
National Register of Historic Places in Sussex County, Delaware
Millsboro, Delaware